Jamie McKendrick (born 27 October 1955) is a British poet and translator.

Early life and education 
McKendrick was born in Liverpool, 27 October 1955, and educated at the Quaker school, Bootham, York, and Liverpool College. He studied English Literature at the University of Nottingham and graduated in 1975. He later developed an interest in the work of the American poet Hart Crane. He has been a visiting lecturer at various institutions including Roehampton College, and was a lettore at the University of Salerno for four years. He has held teaching residencies at Hertford College, Oxford, the University of Gothenburg,  Jan Masaryk University in Brno, the University of Nottingham and University College London. He tutors part-time for the Oxford programmes of Stanford University and Sarah Lawrence and offers a translation workshop for the Creative Writing MSt. also at Oxford.

McKendrick is also a painter: he has had several exhibitions of his works, most recently at St Anne's College, Oxford. His art work has appeared in a pamphlet and on various book covers

Poetry
McKendrick has published seven collections of poetry and two Selected Poems. He is also the editor of The Faber Book of 20th-Century Italian Poems (2004).

Criticism 
McKendrick has written reviews and essays on literature and art for numerous newspapers and magazines, including the TLS, the LRB, Independent on Sunday, The Atheaneum Review and Modern Painters. His essays have been published in several books including: Elizabeth Bishop: Poet of the Periphery; Writers on Art; Literary Activism; he has also written catalogue essays for exhibitions by Arturo Di Stefano and Donald Wilkinson, and an introduction to Tom Lubbock's English Graphic (Francis Lincoln, 2012).

A collection of his writings on art, poetry and translation, The Foreign Connection, was published by Legenda, 2020.

Translations
McKendrick has translated six books of fiction by the Italian novelist Giorgio Bassani, including The Garden of the Finzi-Continis, published as individual volumes by Penguin and, for the first time in English, in a collected edition by Penguin and by Norton in the US.

Awards
McKendrick was named as one of the Poetry Society's 'New Generation' poets in the 1990s, with the Society selecting his 1997 collection Marble Fly as a Poetry Society Book Choice. McKendrick's collections have been shortlisted for the 1997 and 2003 T. S. Eliot Prize, the 2003 Whitbread Poetry Award, and the 2007 Forward Poetry Prize.

His translations of Giorgio Bassani have been shortlisted for the Oxford-Weidenfeld prize and for the John Florio award.

Other awards include:

 2020 Michael Marks Illustration Award (for The Years)
 2020 Michael Marks Poetry Pamphlet Award (for The Years) [shortlisted]
 2019 Cholmondeley Award 
 2016 John Florio Italian Translation Award for Antonella Anedda's Archipelago
 2014 Fellow of the Royal Society of Literature
 2013 Hawthornden Prize for Out There
 2010 John Florio Italian Translation Award for Valerio Magrelli The Embrace
 2010 Oxford-Weidenfeld Translation Prize for Valerio Magrelli's The Embrace
 2005 Cavaliere OSSI (Ordine della Stella della Solidarietà Italiana)
 2003 Society of Authors Travel Award
1997 Forward Prize for Best Collection for The Marble Fly
 1994 Southern Arts Literature Award (for The Kiosk on the Brink)
 1991 Arts Council Writers' Award
 1984 Eric Gregory Award

Selected bibliography

Poetry collections 

 The Sirocco Room (Oxford University Press, 1991)
 The Kiosk on the Brink (Oxford University Press, 1993)
 The Marble Fly (Oxford University Press, 1997)
 Sky Nails: Poems 1979–1997 (Faber and Faber, 2000)
 Ink Stone (Faber and Faber, 2003)
 Crocodiles and Obelisks (Faber and Faber, 2007)
 Out There (Faber and Faber, 2012)
 The Hunters – pamphlet with French and Italian translations (Incline Press, 2015)
 Selected Poems (Faber and Faber, 2016)
 Repairwork – pamphlet (Clutag Press, 5 poems series, 2017)
 Anomaly (Faber and Faber, 2018)
 The Years – pamphlet illustrated by the author (Arc Publications, 2020)

Translations 

 Giorgio Bassani: The Garden of the Finzi-Continis (Penguin, 2007, republished Folio, 2014)
 Valerio Magrelli: The Embrace: Selected Poems (Faber and Faber, 2009, republished in a bilingual edition as Vanishing Points by Farrar Straus Giroux, 2011)
 Pier Paolo Pasolini: Fabrication, a translation of the verse play Affabulazione, (Oberon, 2010). Performed at The Printhouse, London in 2010, directed by Lucy Bailey.
 David Huerta: Poemas/Poems (Poetry Translation Centre pamphlet, 2010)
 Giorgio Bassani: The Gold-Rimmed Spectacles (Penguin, 2012)
 Giorgio Bassani: The Smell of Hay (Penguin, 2014)
 Antonella Anedda: Archipelago (Bloodaxe, 2016)
 Giorgio Bassani:  Within the Walls (Penguin, 2016)
 Giorgio Bassani:  Behind the Door (Penguin, 2017)
 Giorgio Bassani: The Novel of Ferrara (Penguin, 2018, Norton, 2018)

Work translated 
McKendrick's own poems have been translated in magazines, in France in PO&SIE (2014/3-4 No 149-150) by Martin Rueff, in various magazines and anthologies in Italy including Poesie, in Neue Rundschau  in Germany by Jan Wagner, and in Sweden, Holland, Turkey, Iran, Spain, and Argentina. Other translations have been published as books in Holland, Italy, Sweden and Spain:

 Een versteende dierentuin: Gedichten translated by Ko Kooman (Wagner & Van Santen, Sliedrecht, 2000)
 Chiodi di cielo, translated by Luca Guerneri and Antonella Anedda (Donzelli, Rome, 2003)
 En förlorad stad, translated by Lars-Håkan Svennson and Lasse Söderberg (Bokförlaget Faethon, Stockholm, 2020)
 Un perro verde, translated by Nieves García Prados (Valparaíso, Granada, 2021)

References

External links
 Jamie McKendrick Poems in Qualm
 Podcast Interview with Jamie McKendrick by André Naffis-Sahely
 "An Interview with Jamie McKendrick" in the Oxonian Review
 "Interview with Jamie McKendrick, Poet and Translator" in Thresholds
 Praccrit
 Poetry Archive - Jamie McKendrick
 Subtropics - Jamie McKendrick
 British Council Website - Contemporary Writers 
 Isis Magazine - 'Jamie McKendrick on Crocodiles and Obelisks and the Blank Page...'

British poets
Fellows of the Royal Society of Literature
Living people
British male poets
1955 births